The 1953 FIBA European Championship, commonly called FIBA EuroBasket 1953, was the eighth FIBA EuroBasket regional basketball championship, held by FIBA.  Seventeen national teams affiliated with the International Basketball Federation (FIBA) entered the competition.  The competition was hosted by the Soviet Union, champions of EuroBasket 1951.  Moscow was the location of the event.

Results

First round
In the preliminary round, the 17 teams were split up into four groups.  One of the groups had five teams, with the other three having four each.  The top two teams in each group advanced to the final round, while the remaining nine teams were relegated to classification play.

Group A

Group B

Group C

Group D

Lebanon refused to play Israel for political reasons; they received zero points for the match, as opposed to the usual 1 point for a loss.

Classification round 1
The first classification round was played in two round-robin groups.  Teams advanced into the second classification round depending on their results in the first round—first and second place teams played in the 9–12 segment of classification round 2 while third and fourth place teams played for 13th to 16th places.  The fifth place team (one group had 5 teams, the other had 4) received 17th place.

Group 1

Group 2

Classification round 2

Classification 13–16

Classification 15/16

Classification 13/14

Classification 9–12

Classification 11/12

Classification 9/10

Final round
The final round was played as an 8-team round robin, with no further playoffs. 

Egypt refused to play Israel for political reasons; they received zero points for the match, as opposed to the usual 1 point for a loss, meaning they finished with 7 points to Italy's 8 despite having the same record.

Final standings

Team rosters
1. Soviet Union: Otar Korkia, Stepas Butautas, Armenak Alachachian, Ilmar Kullam, Heino Kruus, Anatoly Konev, Aleksandr Moiseyev, Kazys Petkevičius, Justinas Lagunavičius, Yuri Ozerov, Algirdas Lauritėnas, Viktor Vlasov, Gunars Siliņš, Lev Reshetnikov (Coach: Konstantin Travin)

2. Hungary: János Greminger, Tibor Mezőfi, Tibor Zsíros, Laszlo Bánhegyi, Pál Bogár, György Bokor, Tibor Cselkó, Tibor Czinkán, Janos Hody, Laszlo Hody, Ede Komaromi, Péter Papp, Tibor Remay, János Simon (Coach: János Páder)

3. France: André Buffiere, René Chocat, Jacques Dessemme, Jacques Freimuller, Claude Gallay, Robert Guillin, Roger Haudegand, Robert Monclar, Jean Perniceni, Bernard Planque, Marc Quiblier, Henry Rey, Justy Specker, André Vacheresse (Coach: Robert Busnel)

4. Czechoslovakia: Ivan Mrazek, Jiří Baumruk, Zdeněk Bobrovský, Miroslav Škeřík, Jaroslav Šíp, Jan Kozák, Zdeněk Rylich, Radoslav Sís, Jaroslav Tetiva, Jindřich Kinský, Lubomír Kolář, Rudolf Stanček, Eugen Horniak (Coach: Lubomír Dobrý)

5. Israel: Ralph Klein, Avraham Schneor, Zachariah Ofri, Daniel Levy, Menachem Korman, Alfred Cohen, David Heiblum, Simon Schmukler, Ernst Winer, Marcel Hefez, Mark Mimran, Haim Boksenbaum, Reuven Fecher (Coach: Jacob Saltiel)

6. Yugoslavia: Borko Jovanović, Mirko Marjanović, Milan Bjegojević, Đorđe Andrijašević, Ladislav Demšar, Borislav Stanković, Dragan Godžić, Aleksandar Gec, Aleksandar Blašković, Srđan Kalember, Vilmos Lóczi, Borislav Ćurčić, Lajos Engler (Coach: Nebojša Popović)

External links
FIBA Europe EuroBasket 1953
Eurobasket.com 1953 EChampionship
Linguasport.com

1953
1953 in basketball
1953 in Soviet sport
International basketball competitions hosted by the Soviet Union
Sports competitions in Moscow
1953 in Moscow
May 1953 sports events in Europe
June 1953 sports events in Europe